Sanga, or Luba-Sanga, is a Bantu language of the Democratic Republic of Congo. It is closely related to Luba-Katanga.

References

 
Luban languages
Languages of the Democratic Republic of the Congo